How to Ruin Christmas is a 2020 South African comedy television show on Netflix starring Busi Lurayi, Thando Thabethe, and Yonda Thomas  alongside Kagiso Rathebe.

Season 2 prefixed with "The Funeral" started streaming on 10 December 2021 on Netflix. The third season, "The Baby Shower", was released on 9 December 2022.

Cast 
 Busi Lurayi as Tumi Sello
 Thando Thabethe as Beauty Sello
 Yonda Thomas as Khaya Manqele
 Nambitha Ben-Mazwi as Refiloe
 Clementine Mosimane as Dineo Sello
 Sandile Mahlangu as Sbu Twala
 Motlatsi Mafatshe as Themba Twala
 Kagiso Rathebe as Terrence
 Lehlohonolo Saint Seseli as Vusi Twala
 Charmaine Mtinta as Valencia Twala
 Swankie Mafoko as Lydia Twala
 Lethabo Bereng as Cousin Bokang
 Desmond Dube as Uncle Shadrack
 Rami Chuene as Aunt Grace
 Keketso Semoko as Aunt Moipone
 Nandi Nyembe as Gogo Twala
 Dippy Padi as Thando
 Trevor Gumbi as Siya Twala
 T sumo Nkosi as Lulu
 Lindokuhle Modi as Nimrod

Episodes

Season 1: The Wedding (2020)

Season 2: The Funeral (2021)

Season 3 - The Baby Shower (2022)

See also
 List of Christmas films

References 

https://decider.com/2021/12/10/how-to-ruin-christmas-the-funeral-netflix-review/

External links 
 
 

2020 South African television series debuts
South African comedy television series
English-language Netflix original programming
Christmas television series